Die Abenteuer des Werner Holt (The Adventures of Werner Holt) is a novel in two parts by East German author Dieter Noll. The first volume was released at 1960 and the second in 1963. Noll won the National Prize of East Germany for the book, and it sold almost four million copies. The novel was incorporated into the country's school curriculum and was adapted to screen at 1965. The plot revolves around Werner Holt, a young German soldier who becomes disillusioned with the Nazis during the last days of World War II.

References

See also
 Die Abenteuer des Werner Holt (film).

German novels adapted into films
Novels set during World War II
1960 German novels
1963 German novels
German bildungsromans